Socialist Action is a democratic socialist political organization in Canada. Its members write for and distribute the North American monthly newspaper, Socialist Action, published in San Francisco. It has a youth affiliate called Youth for Socialist Action (YSA),.

Origins and international solidarity 
SA/LAS was formed in 1994 by a group of socialists expelled from, or who quit Socialist Challenge/Gauche Socialiste when the latter renounced the Leninist strategy of revolutionary party building. In June 1995, SA/LAS was recognized by the Fourth International at its Fourteenth World Congress, as an "organization of partisans of the FI in the Canadian state". The Quebec-based Gauche Socialiste is the official FI section in Quebec.  Socialist Challenge, its former component in English Canada, dissolved in 1995 into the New Socialist Group where it formed the Fourth International Caucus which was recognized as the FI's official section in English Canada.

Work in the New Democratic Party 
SA/LAS members and supporters play a leading role in the New Democratic Party Socialist Caucus (SC). Socialist Action federal secretary Barry Weisleder has served as chairperson of the Socialist Caucus since its inception. The Socialist Caucus seeks to turn the labour-based party sharply to the left. SA/LAS and the SC played a significant role in stopping removal of the term “socialist” from the NDP constitution at its federal convention in Vancouver, B.C. in June 2011. In September 2011, Socialist Action federal secretary Barry Weisleder won the nomination to be the Ontario NDP's candidate in Thornhill in the 2011 provincial election. Within 48 hours, the party's provincial secretary rescinded the nomination without explanation.

Political programme 
SA/LAS is active in the labour, anti-war, feminist, queer liberation, environmental protection, anti-poverty and international communist movements. Supporting the Palestinian people striving for a unified, democratic-secular homeland is also a claimed goal of this Marxist group. SA/LAS demands an end to the wars of occupation in Afghanistan, Iraq, Pakistan and Libya, restoration of diplomatic relations between Canada and Iran, and that Canada leave NATO.

The Quebec question 
SA/LAS supports Quebec's right to national self-determination, and upholds the right to self-government of aboriginal peoples. In Quebec, LAS members participate in the mass leftist party Quebec Solidaire, which stands for Quebec independence and opposes the neo-liberal business agenda.

Labour movement 
SA/LAS supports the transformation of today's unions into militant, democratic labour organizations that oppose employers' plans for labour concessions and government austerity policies .  The organization supports public ownership of the major sectors of the economy under workers' and community democratic control.

References

External links
SA/LA Website
YSA Webpage
Socialist Action (US)
The Fourth International

1994 establishments in Canada
Communist parties in Canada
Far-left politics in Canada
Fourth International (post-reunification)
New Democratic Party (Canada)
Political parties established in 1994
Socialist parties in Canada
Trotskyist organizations in Canada